The Poisoner or Marie Besnard, l'empoisonneuse is a 2006 French-Belgium drama television film directed by Christian Faure. It stars Muriel Robin as Marie Besnard and it was broadcast on TF1 in 2006.

Plot
In 1947, in Loudun, Mary and Leon Besnard celebrate with their friends, eighteen years of marriage. Marie surprising gestures moved between Leo and her best friend, Louise. Soon after, Leo gets sick and dies. Louise confided to a friend that Leo was convinced he was poisoned by his wife. In Paris, Simone Roulier, a trainee journalist, decides to cover the case.

Cast

 Muriel Robin as Marie Besnard
 Mélanie Bernier as Simone Roulier
 Olivier Saladin as Auguste Leclerc
 Grégory Fitoussi as Monsieur Vidal
 Marie-Hélène Lentini as Madame Rossignol
 Mado Maurin as Madame Davaillaud
 Maurice Antoni as Frédéric Joliot-Curie
 Jean-Yves Chatelais as Léon Besnard
 Annie Grégorio as Louise Pinson
 Marie-France Santon as Madame Trousseau
 Jean-Noël Brouté as Inspector Lavalette
 Cécile Bois as Lawyer Chantal Jacquemin
 Philippe Magnan as Lawyer Gabard
 Philippe du Janerand as President Guirec
 Pierre Laroche as President Boissier
 Jean-Paul Dubois as Doctor Vallois
 Julien Cafaro as Doctor Cellier
 André Penvern as Professor Boiledieu
 René Carton as Professor Griffon
 Max Delor as Professor Kohn-Abres 
 Philippe Faure as Professor Peccoux
 Benoît Georges as Professor Ollivier
 Jean-Marc Roulot as Professor Perrot
 Jacques Leplus as Professor Kelling
 Jean-Pierre Alessandri as Monsieur Bonbour
 Maria Ducceschi as Madame Duzac
 Vincent Duviau as Célestin Fichet
 Zazie Delem as Ginette Baujan
 Nicolas Jouhet as René Davaillaud
 Frank Geney as Ady
 Gérard Chaillou as Bodin
 Pascal Reneric as Jacques
 Maëva Pasquali as Marylou
 Anne Girouard as Henriette
 Jean-Paul Bonnaire as Gaston
 François Aramburu as Pixier
 Stéphane Jobert as Garnier
 Anne Loiret as Simone's Mother

Accolades

References

External links

French drama films
French television films
2006 television films
2006 films
2000s French-language films
2006 drama films
2000s French films